The following is a list of the MTV Europe Music Award winners and nominees for Best African Act.

Winners and nominees
Winners are listed first and highlighted in bold.

2000s

The award was retired in favour of the MTV Africa Music Awards (MAMAs) starting in 2008.

2010s
The award returned in 2012, since Best Worldwide Act has been added to the EMAs.

2020s

References

MTV Europe Music Awards
African awards
Angolan music
South African music
Kenyan music
Nigerien music
Democratic Republic of the Congo music
Tanzanian music
Ghanaian music
Ugandan music
Togolese music
Ivorian music
Awards established in 2005